Albert Anton von Muchar was an Austrian historian. He was descended from the noble and ancient family of the Muchars of Bied and Rangfeld, studied at the lyceum in Graz, entered the Benedictine Order, and made his vows on 16 October 1808, at Admont. Ordained a priest shortly afterwards, he devoted himself entirely to the study of Middle Eastern languages, became librarian and keeper of the archives in 1813, and later on professor of Greek and Middle Eastern languages at the theological school of his monastery. From 1823 to 1825 he was supplementary professor of Biblical science, becoming afterwards professor of aesthetics and classical philology at the University of Graz.

He found that pure philological studies did not suit his taste, and in this branch we possess from him only an edition of Horace with German translation, which appeared in 1835 at Graz. His researches dealt chiefly with the history of Austria, for which purpose he made extensive visits to the libraries of Austria, Bavaria, and Upper Italy; thus, nearly all his historical works are based upon careful examination of the original sources. In 1829, the Academy of Sciences in Vienna elected him a member in recognition of his important contributions to national history, and he was one of the founders of the Historical Society for Inner Austria.

Published works
Das römische Norikum (2 vols., Graz, 1825-6); 
Geschichte des Herzogtums Steiermark (History of the Duchy of Styria; Graz, 1845–74) in nine volumes, of which the first four were edited by himself, the following two by his colleagues, Prangner and von Gräfenstein, and the last three by the Historical Society of Styria. 
Numerous essays for historical periodicals, e. g. Hormayr's "Archiv", the Steiermarkische Zeitschrift, and the Archiv für Kunde österreichischer Geschichtsquellen (in which he published his Urkundenregesten für die Geschichte Innerösterreichs vom Jahre 1312-1500 (Vienna, 1849)). 
The library of Admont possesses in manuscripts some still more extensive works.

References

Attribution
. Cites:
ILWOLF, Albert von Muchar in Mitteil. des histo. Vereins Steiermark, fasc. xiv (Graz, 1866); 
Allg. Deutsche Biogr., XXII (Leipzig, 1885), 436-8.

External links
Albert Muchar von Ried in an Austrian encyclopedia

1849 deaths
19th-century Austrian historians
Austrian Benedictines
1780s births
People from Lienz
Academic staff of the University of Graz
Rectors of universities in Austria
19th-century Austrian Roman Catholic priests